David Kenneth Shroyer (February 1, 1898 – July 6, 1974) was an American football coach.  He served as the head football coach at Western Maryland College, now McDaniel College, from 1922 to 1925, at Franklin & Marshall College from 1926 to 1927, and at New River State College—now known as West Virginia University Institute of Technology—from 1928 to 1933, compiling a career college football record of 50–40–11.

Coaching career

Franklin & Marshall
Schroyer was the head football coach at Franklin & Marshall College in Lancaster, Pennsylvania. He held that position for the 1926 and 1927 seasons. His coaching record at Franklin & Marshall was 1–15–2.

West Virginia Tech
Shroyer was the head football coach for the West Virginia University Institute of Technology in Montgomery, West Virginia. He held that position for six seasons, from 1928 until 1933. His coaching record at West Virginia Tech was 28–11–5.

Later life
Schroyer later became the president of Beckley College at Beckley, West Virginia. He retired from the school in 1967. He died there in 1974 after a short illness.

References

External links
 

1898 births
1974 deaths
Basketball coaches from West Virginia
Heads of universities and colleges in the United States
Franklin & Marshall Diplomats football coaches
Franklin & Marshall Diplomats men's basketball coaches
McDaniel Green Terror football coaches
West Virginia Tech Golden Bears football coaches
People from Buckhannon, West Virginia
Mountain State University people
20th-century American academics